Autonoe , also known as , is a natural satellite of Jupiter.

Autonoe was discovered by a team of astronomers from the University of Hawaii led by Scott S. Sheppard in 2001, and given the temporary designation .

Autonoe is about 4 kilometres in diameter, and orbits Jupiter at an average distance of 24,264,000 km in 719.01 days. It orbits at an inclination of 151° to the ecliptic (150° to Jupiter's equator) in a retrograde direction and with an eccentricity of 0.369.

It belongs to the Pasiphae group, irregular retrograde moons orbiting Jupiter at distances ranging between 22.8 and 24.1 Gm, and with inclinations ranging between 144.5° and 158.3°.

Autonoe was named in August 2003 after the Greek mythological figure Autonoë, conquest of Zeus (Jupiter), mother of the Charites (Gracies), according to some authors.

References

Pasiphae group
Moons of Jupiter
Irregular satellites
Discoveries by Scott S. Sheppard
Astronomical objects discovered in 2001
Moons with a retrograde orbit